Ahmad Al Abdullah Al Sabah (born 5 September 1952) is a Kuwaiti politician and a member of the ruling family, Al Sabah.

Early life and education
Sabah was born on 5 September 1952. He received a bachelor's degree in finance from the University of Illinois in 1975.

Career
Sabah worked at the Central Bank of Kuwait from 1978 to 1987. Then he worked at the private finance institutions from 1987 to 1999. During this period he was the chairman of the Burgan Bank SAK. He was the minister of finance from 1999 to 2001. He was appointed minister of communication in 1999. He was nominated as health minister in March 2007, but was given no confidence vote at the National Assembly which led to the resignation of the government on 4 March. 

In February 2009 Sabah was appointed oil minister, being the fifth minister since 2006. He replaced Mohammad Al Olaim as oil minister who resigned from office in November 2008. Between November 2008 and February 2009 Mohammad Sabah Al Sabah served as acting oil minister. Ahmad Al Sabah's tenure as oil minister ended in May 2011 when Mohammad Al Busairi replaced him in the aforementioned post.

Personal life
Sabah is married and has three children.

References

External links

20th-century Kuwaiti people
21st-century Kuwaiti people
1952 births
Finance ministers of Kuwait
Ahmad Al Abdullah Al Sabah
Leaders of organizations
Living people
Oil ministers of Kuwait
University of Illinois alumni